Ellis Powell may refer to:

Ellis Powell (journalist) (1869-1922), British newspaper editor and colleague of Harry Marks
Ellis Powell, an actress who played the lead role in Mrs Dale's Diary